The 2015–16 Saint Louis Billikens men's basketball team represented Saint Louis University in the 2015–16 NCAA Division I men's basketball season. The Billikens were led by fourth year head coach Jim Crews. The team played their home games at Chaifetz Arena. They were a member of the Atlantic 10 Conference. They finished the season with an 11–22, 5–13 in A-10 play to finish in a tie for 12th place. They defeated George Mason in the first round of the A-10 tournament to advance to the second round where they lost to George Washington.

On March 10, following their exit in the A-10 tournament, head coach Jim Crews was released from his coaching duties by the school. He finished at Saint Louis with a four year record of 77–56.

Previous season 
The Billikens finished the season with an overall record of 11–21, with a record of 3–15 in the Atlantic 10 regular season to end up in the bottom of the Atlantic 10 standings. In the 2015 Atlantic 10 tournament, the Billikens lost to Duquesne in the first round.

Off season
After a terrible 2014-2015 campaign, three of Saint Louis's top players (Grandy Glaze, Austin McBroom, and Tanner Lanconca) decided to leave the program and John Manning graduated from the University. With these four leaving the program Saint Louis lost 303 games of experience and 95 starts from the combined group. This marked a second consecutive year with massive turnover in the players in the program.

Departures

Incoming recruits

Roster

Schedule

|-
!colspan=9 style=| Exhibition

|-
!colspan=9 style=| Non-conference regular season

|-
!colspan=9 style=| Atlantic 10 regular season

|-
!colspan=9 style=| Atlantic 10 tournament

References

Saint Louis
Saint Louis Billikens men's basketball seasons
Saint
Saint